The Department of Transportation and Public Works of Puerto Rico operates the Tren Urbano mass transit network, serving the municipalities of San Juan, Guaynabo and Bayamón. As of 2011, the single  line includes 16 stations. They serve about 40,900 passengers a day, making the Tren Urbano the twelfth-largest rapid transit system in the United States in terms of ridership.

Stations

References

 
Tren Urbano
Railway stations
Transportation in San Juan, Puerto Rico